Anna Märta Viktoria Stenevi, née  Wallin (born 30 March 1976) is a Swedish politician for the Green Party. She served as Minister for Gender Equality and as Minister for Housing from February to November 2021, and as co-spokesperson for the Green Party since January 2021.

She served as her party's secretary-general from May 2019 to January 2021. Before becoming secretary-general, she was regional commissioner of Scania County from 2014 to 2016 and municipal commissioner in Malmö Municipality from 2016 to 2019.

She was elected as Member of the Riksdag in September 2022.

References

External links

|-

|-

|-

|-

|-

Green Party (Sweden) politicians
1976 births
Living people
Swedish people of Danish descent
Members of the Riksdag 2022–2026
21st-century Swedish politicians
21st-century Swedish women politicians
Swedish Ministers for Gender Equality
Women members of the Riksdag